Face Mountain is a  mountain summit located in British Columbia, Canada.

Description
Face Mountain is set in the Thiassi Range of the Coast Mountains. Precipitation runoff and glacial meltwater from the peak drains into Freight Creek and Donelly Creek which are both tributaries of the Hurley River. The mountain's toponym was officially adopted January 23, 1979, by the Geographical Names Board of Canada as identified in Canadian Alpine Journal (1936), and in Dick Culbert's "Alpine Guide to Southwestern British Columbia" (1974).


Climate
Based on the Köppen climate classification, Face Mountain is located in a subarctic climate zone of western North America. Most weather fronts originate in the Pacific Ocean, and travel east toward the Coast Mountains where they are forced upward by the range (Orographic lift), causing them to drop their moisture in the form of rain or snowfall. As a result, the Coast Mountains experience high precipitation, especially during the winter months in the form of snowfall. Winter temperatures can drop below −20 °C with wind chill factors below −30 °C. This climate supports the Freight Glacier on the peak's west slope and the Train Glacier on the south slope. The months July through September offer the most favorable weather for climbing Face Mountain.

See also

 Geography of British Columbia
 Geology of British Columbia

References

External links
 Weather: Face Mountain 

Two-thousanders of British Columbia
Pacific Ranges
Lillooet Land District
Coast Mountains